Terence Eugene Holbrook (born July 11, 1950) is a Canadian former professional ice hockey player who played in the National Hockey League (NHL) and World Hockey Association (WHA).

Early life 
Holbrook was born in Petrolia, Ontario, but grew up in Watford, Ontario.

Career 
Drafted in the third round of the 1970 NHL Amateur Draft by the Los Angeles Kings, Holbrook played parts of two NHL seasons with the Minnesota North Stars. He played the final two seasons of his career with the Cleveland Crusaders of the WHA.

Career statistics

References

External links

1950 births
Canadian ice hockey right wingers
Cleveland Barons (1937–1973) players
Cleveland Crusaders players
Ice hockey people from Ontario
Living people
London Knights players
Los Angeles Kings draft picks
Minnesota North Stars players
New Haven Nighthawks players
People from Lambton County
Springfield Kings players